August Neidhart (12 May 1867 in Vienna, Kaisertum Österreich – 25 November 1934 in Berlin) was an Austrian writer and librettist.

Neidhart was an author of folk plays and operettas. His earlier works include Das Protektionskind, Schwank (by Alexander Engel and August Neidhart). He achieved a worldwide success as a librettist for Leon Jessel's operetta Schwarzwaldmädel (Alte Komische Oper Berlin, 25 August 1917).

Operettas 
Der Triumph des Weibes, 1906; music by Joseph Hellmesberger Jr.
Belagerungszustand, 1909; music by Leo Ascher
Der junge Papa, 1909 (with Alexander Engel); music by Edmund Eysler
Sein Herzensjunge, 1911 (with Rudolph Schanzer); music by Walter Kollo
Schwarzwaldmädel, 1917; music by Leon Jessel
Ein modernes Mädel, 1918; music by Leon Jessel
, 1919; music by Eduard Künneke
Baroneßchen Sarah, 1920; music by Leo Ascher
Die Strohwitwe, 1920; music by Leo Blech
Die Postmeisterin, 1921; music by Leon Jessel
Die Straßensängerin, 1922; music by Leo Fall
Ninon am Scheideweg, 1926; music by Leo Ascher
Die Luxuskabine, 1929; music by Leon Jessel
Junger Wein, 1933; music by Leon Jessel

References

External links 
 
 
 Die Unschuld unterm Bollenhut
 August Neidhart on ZVAB.com
 

1867 births
1934 deaths
Writers from Vienna
19th-century Austrian writers
20th-century Austrian writers
Austrian operetta librettists